The House of Gagarin is the name of a Russian princely family descending from sovereign rulers of Starodub-on-the-Klyazma.

Origins

The descendant of the Great Prince Vladimir Svyatoslavich, the Christianizer of Russia, Prince Ivan Vsevolodovich, received from his brother, the Great Prince Yaroslav Vsevolodovich, the appanage of Starodub, and this originated the Princes of Starodub. The great-great-grandson of this Prince Ivan, Prince Ivan Fedorovich, called Lapa-Golibesovskoy, had a son, Prince Mikhail, and he had three sons: Princes Vasilii, Yuri, and Ivan Gagara, whose descendants, the Princes Gagarin, served the Russian Throne as Boyars and in other distinguished positions.

The history of the Russian Empire shows that many of the Princes Gagarin, both in ancient times as well as in more recent times, were granted fiefdoms for their service to the fatherland, and they were rewarded with several Orders and other tokens of the Monarch's favor.

Notable figures

Prince Nikolai Sergeevich Gagarin

Prince (Knyaz) Nikolai Sergeevich Gagarin (князь Николай Сергеевич Гагарин) (July 12, 1784 — July 25, 1842)

Born in London, Prince Gagarin was appointed to the highest command of the 1st infantry during a drawing-up of the Moscow military force (July 1812). He took part in the Battle of Borodino, the largest and bloodiest single-day battle of the Napoleonic Wars, involving more than a quarter of a million soldiers. Prince Gagarin also owned several businesses throughout Russia and Europe. In 1819, Prince Gagarin married Maria Alexeeva Bobrinsky (Bobrinskaya), daughter of Count Bobrinsky, granddaughter of Catherine II of Russia and Prince Gregory Orlov.

On October 16, 1833, Prince Gagarin was appointed to the post of vice-president of the His Majesty's Cabinet under Emperor Nicholas I and Chairman Viktor Kochubey. In December 1837, he was appointed a member of the commission for the restoration of the Winter Palace after a fire. During service as vice-president, he was the recipient of several distinctions: the Order of Saint Stanislaus 1st class (1834), the Order of St. Anna 1st class (1835), the Order of St. Vladimir 2nd class (1839) and the Order of the White Eagle (1841). 

Prince Gagarin died a violent death by the hand of a forest warden with a fatal shot in the neck. Contrary to what is explained, Prince Gagarin was not his employer; the poor man just chose Prince Gagarin randomly. Prince Gagarin was killed in Saint Petersburg. Despite medical aid, the prince died in minutes. Rejnman explained that he killed Gagarin because he had been exposed to oppression and had lost his rank. However, according to his contemporaries' testimonies, Prince Gagarin had been a humane employer.

Prince Nikolai Sergeevich Gagarin's descendants were forced into exile during the Russian Revolution and lived in France until recently.  Most  descendants now live in the United States.

Prince Grigory Grigorevich Gagarin

Prince Grigory Grigorevich Gagarin (Григорий Григорьевич) was born on April 29, 1810. He was the vice-president of the Imperial Academy of Arts, a renowned artist, a Major General and a diplomat. He was the son of Prince Grigory Ivanovich Gagarin.

Grigory Grigorevich spent much of his time traveling and always carried a sketchbook, drawing or watercoloring impressions from most of his stops. A variety of the figures which have remained include studies, sketches, and other types - testifying to the breadth of his artistic talent.

Descendants of Prince Grigory Grigorievich Gagarin still live in Russia.

External links

 The Princely House of Gagarin History & Genealogy
  Gagarin genealogy
  Biography of Gregory Gregorivich - painter

 
Russian noble families